Resistance is a 2011 Welsh film directed by Amit Gupta and starring Andrea Riseborough, Tom Wlaschiha and Michael Sheen. It is based on the 2007 novel of the same name by Owen Sheers. The film takes place in an alternative reality in which Germany invades the United Kingdom during World War II.

Plot
After all the women in a remote valley on the Welsh border awaken to find their husbands have left to serve in the covert British Resistance, German occupiers arrive in the alternative reality thriller set in 1944 in which D-Day has failed and the United Kingdom has been invaded successfully by Germany. Facing a harsh winter, the women and soldiers find they must co-operate to survive, but each distrusts the others. The women want to remain loyal to their absent husbands, the soldiers are at war and the women are their enemy. Over time, the soldiers stop wearing their uniforms. The Germans help with farm chores or may leave a couple of shot rabbits on a porch. The Germans think the war may be over soon and want to take advantage of spending the winter away from war.

Captain Albrecht becomes close to Sarah. To prove he can be trusted, he takes her to a cave where a priceless Medieval world map has been hidden from the Germans. He studied mediaeval history and even he does not want the SS or Himmler to get it. Another much more elderly wife named Maggie has become friends with Bernhardt.

Spring has arrived and Sarah convinces Albrecht to let Maggie take her prized cob horse to the county fair, and Bernhardt accompanies her. The women wanted to know if there was any news of their husbands. A friend of Maggie tells her that the group of men that blew up the railway bridge had all been hanged by the Nazis. Maggie returns to the valley with a third-place win but very changed with the knowledge that the husbands are dead. Young teen George sees Maggie's fair trip as collaboration with the enemy and shoots her horse in punishment. The loss of both her husband and her horse is enough to kill Maggie.

Soldier Steiner distrusts the valley women and he runs off to town with the Army radio. Albrecht is in love with Sarah and asks her to escape off with him before the Gestapo come. She agrees but actually goes home and writes her date of death in the family Bible. She then makes sure to burn the priceless map to keep it from the Germans. Always loyal to her husband and country, she walks off into the mountains to escape, and the film ends.

Cast
Andrea Riseborough as Sarah Lewis 
Tom Wlaschiha as  Captain Albrecht Wolfram 
Michael Sheen as Tommy Atkins
Kimberley Nixon as Bethan Evans
Alexander Dreymon as Steiner 
Iwan Rheon as George Bowen
Simon Armstrong as George's father
Stanislav Ianevski as Bernhardt
Sharon Morgan as Maggie Jones 
Melanie Walters as Helen Roberts
Anatole Taubman as Sebald 
Matt Hookings as German soldier 
Mossie Smith as Ruth Evans 
George Taylor as Gernot 
Jassa Ahluwalia as Russian Partisan (voice) 
Nia Gwynne as Sian Griffiths
Tomos Eames as Tom Lewis 
Kerry Hutchinson as Gestapo officer
Callan Mcauliffe as Terrence Green
Marie Ingle as Terrence Green's girlfriend

External links

Film Agency For Wales

English-language Welsh films
English-language German films
Films based on British novels
Films set in Wales
Films shot in Wales
Films set in 1944
British alternative history films
Films about World War II alternate histories
British World War II films
German World War II films
2010s English-language films
2010s British films
2010s German films